Primo Baran (born 1 April 1943) is a retired Italian rower who had his best achievements in the coxed pairs, together with Renzo Sambo. They won a European title in 1967 and an Olympic gold in 1968.

Baran took rowing in 1962 and worked as a rowing coach after retiring from competitions.

References

External links

 

1943 births
Sportspeople from Treviso
Living people
Italian male rowers
Olympic rowers of Italy
Olympic gold medalists for Italy
Rowers at the 1968 Summer Olympics
Rowers at the 1972 Summer Olympics
Rowers at the 1976 Summer Olympics
Olympic medalists in rowing
World Rowing Championships medalists for Italy
Medalists at the 1968 Summer Olympics
European Rowing Championships medalists